Piz Combul (also known as Pizzo Combolo) is a mountain of the Bernina Range (Alps), located on the border between Italy and Switzerland. It lies between the Val Fontana and the Val Poschiavo. With a height of 2,901 metres above sea level, Piz Combul is the highest summit of the range lying south of the Bocchetta da Vartegna (2,588 m).

References

External links
 Piz Combul on Hikr

Mountains of the Alps
Mountains of Graubünden
Mountains of Italy
Italy–Switzerland border
International mountains of Europe
Mountains of Switzerland
Two-thousanders of Switzerland